Alta Vista is a hamlet in the Canadian province of Saskatchewan. It is located on Last Mountain Lake, across the narrow lake from Regina Beach.

Demographics 

References

Designated places in Saskatchewan
McKillop No. 220, Saskatchewan
Organized hamlets in Saskatchewan
Division No. 6, Saskatchewan